Aristodemo Giorgini (1879 – 19 January 1937) was an Italian opera singer who sang leading lyric tenor roles on the stages of Europe and  North America during his 25-year career. He made numerous recordings in the early 20th century and was described by Gramophone Magazine as possessing "a sweet, steady, well-placed voice and a style distinguished by the purity of its legato." After his retirement from the stage in 1930, he taught singing in Naples, the city of his birth.

Life and career
Giorgini was born in Naples and studied at the Accademia di Santa Cecilia in Rome. He made an unsuccessful stage debut in Naples in 1903 after which he pursued further private vocal studies with Massimino Perilli. In 1904 he made his first recording for G&T, and the following year made his La Scala debut as Ernesto in Don Pasquale. He went on to sing in most of the major opera houses in Italy. Giorgini returned to La Scala in 1910 when he had a great success as Elvino in La sonnambula opposite Rosina Storchio and again in 1913 as the tenor soloist a special performance of Verdi's Messa da Requiem commemorating the 100th anniversary of the composer's birth.

Giorgini's appearances outside Italy began early in his career when he performed at Covent Garden in 1905 as Don Ottavio in Don Giovanni, Rodolfo in La bohème (in which he alternated with tenor Emilio de Marchi), and the Duke of Mantua in Rigoletto. He sang at the Court Opera of St. Petersburg in 1906 and later sang at the Teatro Politeama in Buenos Aires, the Opéra de Monte-Carlo in Monaco, Teatro Liceo in Barcelona, the Teatro Real in Madrid, and the Teatro de São Carlos in Lisbon. Between 1912 and 1914 Giorgini was engaged by the Chicago Grand Opera Company, performing with the company both in Chicago and on tour around the United States. Amongst the roles he sang with Chicago Opera were Gennaro in Jewels of the Madonna, Edgardo in Lucia di Lammermoor, Alfredo in La traviata, Florindo in I dispettosi amanti, Count Almaviva in The Barber of Seville, the Duke of Mantua in Rigoletto, Cavaradossi in Tosca, Elvino in La sonnambula, Don Ottavio in Don Giovanni, and Enzo in La Gioconda.

Giorgini's performances in the 1920s included Faust in Mefistofele at the Teatro dal Verme in 1920 and  Cavaradossi in Tosca at the Vienna Staatsoper in 1921 as well as a concert tour through Belgium and Holland in 1923. He retired from the stage in 1930 and became a singing teacher in Naples where he died in 1937.

Recordings
Giorgini made multiple recordings for the G&T, Pathé, Edison, and HMV labels. Most of these were individual arias, but in 1928 towards the end of his career he was recorded in a full-length La bohème with Carlo Sabajno conducting the La Scala Orchestra and Chorus. Rosina Torri was the Mimì to his Rodolfo. Originally released on the HMV label, a remastered version of this recording was released on CD by VAI in 1994.

In 1995, The Record Collector released the CD The Art of Aristodemo Giorgini, a collection of 27 art songs and arias most of which were recorded early in Giorgini's career. The operas represented include L'Africaine, Tosca, Fedora, I puritani, La sonnambula, Les pêcheurs de perles, Luisa Miller, Adriana Lecouvreur, Werther, Il Barbiere di Siviglia, Don Pasquale, Lucia di Lammermoor, Pagliacci, and La fanciulla del West.

Notes

References

Further reading
Bisogni, Vincenzo Ramon (2005). All'ombra del Vesuvio, pp. 273–278. Parma: Azzali.

External links
1906 audio recording of Giorgini singing "Com'e gentil" from Don Pasquale (on archive.org)
1909 audio recording of Giorgini and Giuseppina Huguet singing "D'un pensiero" from La sonnambula (on archive.org)

Italian operatic tenors
1879 births
1937 deaths
Musicians from Naples
Accademia Nazionale di Santa Cecilia alumni
People from Castel Gandolfo